Abraham Smith (17 December 1910 – 1974) was an English professional footballer who played in The Football League for Portsmouth. He also played for Mansfield Town.

References

English footballers
Portsmouth F.C. players
Mansfield Town F.C. players
English Football League players
1910 births
1974 deaths
Association football midfielders